Wairio is a town in the Southland region of New Zealand's South Island.

The population was 942 in the 2013 census. This was an increase of 33 people since the 2006 Census.

References 

Populated places in Southland, New Zealand